Předhradí is a municipality and village in Chrudim District in the Pardubice Region of the Czech Republic. It has about 400 inhabitants. The historic centre with the Rychmburk Castle is well preserved and is protected by law as an urban monument zone.

Administrative parts
The hamlet of Dolívka is administrative part of Předhradí.

Geography
It lies in the Iron Mountains. It is situated on the left bank of the Krounka River, which forms the eastern municipal border.

History

Rychmburk Castle was probably built in the early 13th century. In the first half of the 14th century, it was rebuilt and extended. In 1530–1540, it was rebuilt in the Renaissance style. Among its owners belonged Lords of Waldstein (1500–1555), Berka of Dubá family (1555–1709), House of Kinsky (1718–1823), and House of Thurn und Taxis (1823–1918).

The first written mention of the settlement of Předhradí comes from 1654.

Sights

Rychmburk Castle is the main landmark of Předhradí. Today the premises partly serves as retirement house. There is also an exposition of the history of the castle, a chapel, a concert hall, and a castle tower open to the public.
 
The main sight of the village is the Church of Our Lady of Sorrows. It was built in 1753. Opposite the church is the manor garden with a gazebo and a bust of Philipp Kinsky (1742–1827), the founder of the garden and the owner of the manor for more than 50 years.

Notable people
Adolf Heyduk (1835–1923), poet

References

External links

Rychmburk Castle

Villages in Chrudim District